Alfréd Kemény (1895, Újvidék, Kingdom of Hungary (today Novi Sad, Serbia) – August 1945, Budapest, Hungary) was a Hungarian artist and art critic.

Notable works
 "Notes to the Russian Artists’ Exhibition in Berlin", ( “Jegyzetek az orosz mũvészek berlini kiállitáshoz,”), Egység (February, 1923)
 "Abstract Design from Suprematism to the Present", ("Die abstrakte Gestaltung vom Suprematismus bis heute" in Das Kunstblatt (No. 8, 1924)

References

1895 births
1945 deaths
Artists from Novi Sad
Hungarian art critics
Hungarian communists